Expressways in Mainland China were speed limited to  since the PRC's first road-related law, the Road Traffic Safety Law of the People's Republic of China, came into effect on 1 May 2004.

Semi-expressways and city express routes (called kuàisù gōnglù in Chinese, meaning "high speed public road") generally have lower speed limits of : in some cases the speed limit may be lower.

On China National Highways (which are not expressways), a common speed limit is 80 km/h (50 mph). In some localities, speed limits may drop to 40 km/h (25 mph).

On some designated "fast through routes" in cities, speed limits are up to 80 km/h (50 mph). Otherwise, speed limits are 70 km/h (43 mph) on roads with two uninterrupted yellow lines and 60 km/h (37 mph) or 50 km/h (31 mph) otherwise. Signage in towns and on expressways is often present.

Minimum speed limits on expressways vary. A general minimum speed limit of 60 km/h (37 mph) is in force at all times (although traffic jams thwart it).

On expressways in mainland China, automobiles are generally 100-120 km/h, while buses and trucks are generally limited to 80-100 km/h. Other road conditions are the same as those of automobiles. In the Hong Kong Special Administrative Region, expressways are usually 80 km/h; in the Macao Special Administrative Region, the speed limit is 80 km/h (Hong Kong-Zhuhai-Macao Bridge); and in Taiwan, the speed limit is 110 km/h.

References

China